Begunia is a Block Town of Khordha district of the Indian state of Odisha. The distance form district head quarter is 18 km. And the Odisha State Highway (which is known as Khordha to Balangir) going on this town and also a Railway transport is working a via form khordha town station. 

Begunia (Vidhan Sabha constituency) is the assembly constituency for this region. This constituency includes Begunia block and Bologarh block.

References

Khordha district